Akdurmuş is a village in the Bingöl District, Bingöl Province, Turkey. The village is populated by Kurds of the Az tribe and had a population of 175 in 2021.

The hamlet of Dikmence is attached to the village.

References

Villages in Bingöl District
Kurdish settlements in Bingöl Province